Keith John Robinson (born 14 December 1976 in Te Aroha, New Zealand) is a  former New Zealand rugby union footballer. His usual position is at lock. He was first selected for New Zealand's national team, the All Blacks in 2002. His career was plagued by injury, and he was selected into the 2006 All Blacks after making a remarkable comeback from a serious back injury. He last played against the Pacific Islanders in 2004 before making a comeback in the 2006 Autumn internationals. He made his Test debut on the All Blacks end-of-year tour in 2002 but, after three Tests, had to wait another 18 months to be recalled by Graham Henry for the Tri-Nations Tests in 2004. Robinson made a surprise return to Waikato's Air New Zealand Cup side in September 2006. In October 2007 he announced he was retiring from all rugby at the age of only 30. He cited his recurring left knee injury as the reason for his retirement.

Conviction
Robinson pleaded guilty to a charge of injuring with intent to injure after punching a man while on a pub crawl in 2012. He was sentenced to 300 hours of community service and ordered to pay $1,000 to his victim.

References

External links

1976 births
Living people
Chiefs (rugby union) players
New Zealand international rugby union players
New Zealand rugby union players
Rugby union locks
Rugby union players from Te Aroha
Taranaki rugby union players
Waikato rugby union players